Black Talk! is an album by organist Charles Earland which was recorded in 1969 and released on the Prestige label.

Reception

Allmusic awarded the album 5 stars with reviewer Scott Yanow calling it "one of the few successful examples of jazz musicians from the late '60s taking a few rock and pop songs and turning them into creative jazz" and stating "Fans of organ combos are advised to pick up this interesting set".

The title track is also featured in the 1972 film and its respective soundtrack Fritz the Cat (film).

Track listing 
All compositions by Charles Earland except where noted.
 "Black Talk" – 7:50   
 "The Mighty Burner" – 3:04   
 "Here Comes Charlie" – 8:15   
 "Aquarius" (James Rado, Gerome Ragni, Galt MacDermot) – 8:00   
 "More Today Than Yesterday" (Pat Upton) – 11:10

Personnel 
Charles Earland – organ
Virgil Jones – trumpet
Houston Person – tenor saxophone
Melvin Sparks – guitar
Idris Muhammad – drums
Buddy Caldwell – congas (on tracks 2 & 5)

References 

Charles Earland albums
1970 albums
Prestige Records albums
Albums recorded at Van Gelder Studio
Albums produced by Bob Porter (record producer)